Eric A. Spiegel (born September 11, 1957 in Youngstown, Ohio ) is an American business executive. From January 2010 through December 2016, Spiegel served as President and CEO of Siemens USA, a subsidiary of the Siemens Corporation.

Biography 
Spiegel's father owned many business during his childhood, one of them was a construction company. Through that, Spiegel worked at power plants in his youth. He studied Economics and worked at Booz Allen Hamilton in the oil, gas, power, and chemical sector for 23 years.

Education
Spiegel received an MBA from the Tuck School of Business at Dartmouth College (he was an Edward Tuck Scholar) and his A.B. with Honors in Economics from Harvard University.

References

External links 
 Siemens executive bio and photo

Living people
1957 births
American chief executives
Businesspeople from Youngstown, Ohio
Harvard University alumni
Tuck School of Business alumni